Maria Caterina Rosalbina Caradori-Allan (née de Munck; 1800–1865) was a French operatic soprano.

Life
Caradori-Allan was born at the Casa Palatina, Milan, in 1800. Her father, Baron de Munck, was an Alsatian, who served in the French army, while her mother, whose maiden name was Caradori, was a native of Saint Petersburg. According to the New American Cyclopedia, and Moore's Complete Encyclopaedia of Music, her father died when she was 20, leaving the family short of funds, and obliging her to employ professionally her musical talents, which had previously been under the direction of her mother, as "an elegant accomplishment". She must have had a good education as she developed into a versatile polyglot, proficient in English, French, German and Italian.

After a tour in France and part of Germany,  the influence and support of Count St. Antonio resulted in her engagement at King's Theatre in London, where she made her first appearance as Cherubino in Le nozze di Figaro on 12 January 1822. The Examiner of 20 January 1822 reviewed her début favourably

Her salary for this first season was £300. In 1823, she was re-engaged, at a salary of £400, and appeared as Vitellia in Mozart's La clemenza di Tito, and as Carlotta in Saverio Mercadante's Elisa e Claudio. 

In 1824, she married Mr. E. T. Allan, the secretary of the King's Theatre, where she was again engaged at a salary of £500, singing with Catalani in Mayr's Nuovo latico per la Musica, and (as a benefit for herself) as Zerlina in Don Giovanni. In the following year her chief parts were Carlotta in Pietro Generali's L'Adelina, Fatima in Gioachino Rossini's Pietro l'Eremita, and Palmide in Giacomo Meyerbeer's Il crociato in Egitto; in the latter opera she was associated with the castrato Velluti. 

In 1826, her salary, which had been lowered to £400, was raised to £700, and she sang with Giuditta Pasta in Zingarelli's Giulietta e Romeo, and as Rosina in Il Barbiere di Seviglia. However, during the following year, her salary rose to  £1,200, but this was the last season of Italian opera in England for some time.  After that, Caradori-Allan went to the continent.

She sang in Venice in 1830, where she created the role of Giulietta in Bellini's I Capuleti e i Montecchi, but in 1834 re-appeared in Italian opera in London, and after 1835 remained mainly in England until her death.

She sang the soprano solo at the British première of Beethoven's Symphony No. 9 on 21 March 1825 and, at about that time, took part in the York festival and was at Gloucester. In 1827 she performed at the Leicester and Worcester festivals. In 1834, she sang in the Handel festival in Westminster Abbey, in 1836 at the Winchester festival with Maria Malibran, and in 1846 she took part in Felix Mendelssohn's Elijah at a production given at the Birmingham festival.

In the final phase of her career, she abandoned the stage for oratorio and concert singing, in which she achieved great success. In 1840, she undertook a successful concert tour in the United States. She was a regular performer at the Concerts of Antient Music, and did some teaching. She also composed; The Daily News of 12 July 1847 reviewed her compositions favourably:

Her mother, Elizabeth de Munck (née Caradori), died in London in 1841, aged 79. She was buried in Highgate Cemetery. Her grave monument has a relief carving of a pelican illustrating the legend that a mother pelican would sacrifice herself in times of need by pecking her breast and letting her chicks drink her blood. Beneath this are the words, “Ici repose ma meillure amie, ma mère”.

She retired in 1848 following the end of season Concert of Ancient Music on 14 June, although she put in one final appearance on the platform, for the Crystal Palace concert which opened The Great Exhibition on 1 May 1851. She died at Elm Lodge, Surbiton, on 15 October 1865.

Assessment
Throughout her life, Madame Caradori-Allan enjoyed great popularity. She was personally amiable and unaffected. Musically, she was highly accomplished, being an excellent sight reader and a well-regarded composer of songs for solo and ensemble voices. Her singing was more remarkable for finish than for force; her voice was characterized as pure, sweet, clear, silvery, and flexible. However, it was said of her that "she always delighted, but never surprised" her audiences. As an actress she was charming.

References
Notes

Sources
Boyd, Charles Newell; Waldo Selden Pratt (1922),Grove's Dictionary of Music and Musicians, T. Presser, pp. 460–462.  Accessed 28 July 2013

 

Attribution

External links

1800 births
1865 deaths
Singers from Milan
French operatic sopranos
19th-century French women opera singers